Stratis may refer to:

 Stratis (configuration daemon), a user-level file system for Linux
 Stratis (Greyhawk), a deity from the Greyhawk campaign setting for the Dungeons & Dragons fantasy role-playing game
 Ai Stratis or Agios Efstratios, a Greek island

People with the given name
 Stratis Eleftheriades (1889–1983), Greek art critic, patron and publisher
 Stratis Haviaras (1935–2020), author in Greek and English
 Stratis Mastrokyriakos (born 1967), professional football (soccer) coach and former player
 Stratis Myrivilis (1890–1969), Greek writer
 Stratis Paschalis (born 1958), Greek poet, novelist and translator

See also
 Eustratius (disambiguation), 
 Stratis, a diminutive form of the Greek given name Efstratios; see Eustratius